Sheykhvanlu may refer to:
 Sheykhanlu-ye Olya
 Sheykhanlu-ye Sofla